Melina Abdullah (born Melina Rachel Reimann on September 18, 1972) is an American academic and civic leader. She is the former chair of the department of Pan-African Studies at California State University, Los Angeles, and a co-founder of the Los Angeles chapter of Black Lives Matter. She is also a supporter of the Southern Poverty Law Center designated hate group, Nation of Islam.

Early life and education
Melina Rachel Reimann was born on September 18, 1972, at East Oakland, Oakland, California, U.S. Her father, John Reimann, was "a union organizer and self-proclaimed Trotskyist." Her mother is Linda Fowler Blackston and she was raised by Oji "Baba" Blackston.  Her paternal grandfather was Günter Reimann (born Hans Steinicke), a German-Jewish Marxist economist and member of the Communist Party of Germany who opposed Adolf Hitler and the Third Reich.

She graduated from Howard University, where she earned a bachelor's of arts (B.A.) degree in African American Studies. She subsequently earned a master's degree (M.A.) and doctoral degree (PhD.) in political science from the University of Southern California. Reimann changed her surname to Abdullah due to her marriage to filmmaker Phaylen Abdullah and kept the name after their divorce.

Activism 
Abdullah is a self-described "womanist scholar-activist". She has said that her academic roles are connected with her activist role in fighting for liberating those who have been exploited many times. She serves on several boards, including Black Community, Clergy and Labor Alliance (BCCLA), Los Angeles Community Action Network (LA-CAN), and Strategic Concepts in Organizing and Policy Education (SCOPE).

Career
Abdullah is a tenured professor and served as chair of the department of Pan-African Studies at California State University, Los Angeles. She was interviewed in 13th, a 2016 documentary about mass incarceration in the United States.

Abdullah has served on the Los Angeles County Human Relations Commission since 2014. She is a co-founder of the Black Lives Matter chapter in Los Angeles, California, and regularly writes articles for the LA Progressive.

Abdullah was arrested on suspicion of battery against a police officer, following an incident in which she allegedly grabbed the officer’s arm during the arrest of protester Sheila Hines-Brim at an LAPD police commission hearing. Hines-Brim allegedly threw an unknown powdery substance at Los Angeles Police Chief Charlie Beck, which she claimed were the cremated ashes of her niece Wakiesha Wilson (who died in LAPD custody in 2016).  Abdullah was charged with misdemeanor battery, as well as seven other counts: these charges included interfering with a public business establishment and the lawful business of the Police Commission during separate incidents in 2017. The criminal charges against Abdullah were eventually dismissed.  The city later agreed to pay Wilson’s family nearly $300,000 to settle a lawsuit they filed over her death.    

During the Sunday debate by ABC7 for the 2022 Los Angeles mayoral election, police removed Melina Abdullah, at Cal State LA as well as other protesters from the room as they did not have a tickets to the event.

Controversy 
Abdullah is a supporter of Louis Farrakhan and the Nation of Islam, and has previously partnered with Farrakhan. The Nation of Islam has been categorized as a hate group by the Southern Poverty Law Center for its anti-white, antisemitic, and anti-LGBT rhetoric. Farrakhan and the Nation of Islam have been extensively condemned by the Anti-Defamation League, which combats antisemitism.

Personal life 
Abdullah resides in Mid-City, Los Angeles. She has three children.

References

External links 
 Black Community, Clergy and Labor Alliance (BCCLA)
 Los Angeles Community Action Network (LA-CAN)
 Strategic Concepts in Organizing and Policy Education (SCOPE)
 LA Progressive

1972 births
Living people
Activists from Oakland, California
People from Crenshaw, Los Angeles
Howard University alumni
University of Southern California alumni
California State University, Los Angeles faculty
African-American women academics
21st-century African-American academics
21st-century American academics
Black Lives Matter people
Activists from Los Angeles
American Trotskyists
American women academics
American people of German-Jewish descent
21st-century American women